Hazur Sahib Nanded–Shri Ganganagar Express is a Superfast Express train belonging to Indian Railways North Western Railway zone that run between  and  in India.

Service 
It operates as train number 12485 from Hazur Sahib Nanded to Shri Ganganagar Junction and as train number 12486 in the reverse direction, serving the states of Maharashtra, Madhya Pradesh, Uttar Pradesh, Delhi, Haryana, Punjab & Rajasthan.

Coaches

The 12485 / 86 Hazur Sahib Nanded–Shri Ganganagar Junction  Express has one AC 2 Tier, four AC 3-tier, seven sleeper class, six general unreserved & two SLR (seating with luggage rake) coaches. It doesn't carry a pantry car.

As with most train services in India, coach composition may be amended at the discretion of Indian Railways depending on demand.

Routeing

Traction
It is hauled by a Pune-based WDP-4D locomotive from NED to AK. From AK to NDLS it is hauled by a Tughlakabad-based WAP-7 or Ghaziabad-based WAP-5 locomotive and then handing over to a Tughlakabad-based WDM-3A locomotive from DLS to GNR & vice versa.

References

External links
12485 Hazur Sahib Nanded Shri Ganganagar Junction Express at India Rail Info
12486 Shri Ganganagar Junction Hazur Sahib Nanded Express at India Rail Info

Express trains in India
Rail transport in Maharashtra
Rail transport in Madhya Pradesh
Rail transport in Uttar Pradesh
Rail transport in Delhi
Rail transport in Haryana
Transport in Nanded
Rail transport in Punjab, India
Rail transport in Rajasthan